The Attorney General for Bangladesh is the Bangladeshi government's chief legal adviser, and its primary lawyer in the Supreme Court of Bangladesh. The Attorney General is usually a highly respected Senior Advocate, and is appointed by the ruling government. AM Amin Uddin is the current and 16th Attorney General for Bangladesh. The Attorney General is the ex-officio chairman of the Bangladesh Bar Council and accordingly he performs the duties assigned to that post and empowered to participate in any reference to the Supreme Court of Bangladesh made by the President under article 106 of the Constitution and can express his own opinion.

Unlike the Attorney General of the United States, the Attorney General for Bangladesh does not have any executive authority, and is not a political appointee; those functions are performed by the Minister of Justice. The Attorney General is assisted by the several Additional Attorneys-General, Deputy Attorneys-General, and Assistant Attorneys-General.

List of Attorneys General

See also

 Chief Justice of Bangladesh
Justice ministry
Politics of Bangladesh

References 

Attorneys General of Bangladesh
Justice ministries
Government of Bangladesh